The M11 is a short metropolitan route in Cape Town, South Africa. It consists of one street (Tienie Meyer Road) in the Bellville CBD.

Route 
The M11 begins at a junction with the M16 (Francie van Zijl Road) and heads eastwards for 2 kilometres to end at a junction with the M10 (Robert Sobukwe Road).

References 

Roads in Cape Town
Streets and roads of Cape Town
Metropolitan routes in Cape Town